Evidence is anything presented as proof of an assertion.

Evidence may also refer to:

 Scientific evidence
 Evidence (law), which governs testimony and exhibits presented in a case

Music

Artists
 Evidence (musician) (born 1976), a member of hip hop group Dilated Peoples
 The Evidence (band), a progressive-punk power-trio from Canada

Albums
 Evidence (Steve Lacy album), 1962
 Evidence (Mal Waldron album), 1988
 Evidence (Vincent Herring album), 1991
 Evidence (The Angels album), 1994
 Evidence, an album by Karmacoda, 2003
 Evidence (Prime Circle album), 2012

Songs
 "Evidence" (Faith No More song), 1995
 "Evidence" (Josh Baldwin song), 2020
 "Evidence" (Mia Wray song), 2022
 "Evidence", a song by Everlife from the 2004 album Everlife
 "Evidence", a song by Marilyn Manson  from the 2007 album Eat Me, Drink Me
 "Evidence", a song by Tara MacLean from the 1995 album Silence
 "Evidence", a song by Thelonious Monk from the 1958 album Misterioso

Record label
 Evidence Music, a jazz record label

TV and movies
 Evidence (1915 film), a silent film drama
 Evidence (1922 film), a silent film drama
 Evidence (1929 film), a sound film
 Evidence (1988 film), a Malayalam film
 Evidence (2012 film), a found-footage horror film
 Evidence (2013 film), a found-footage crime thriller
 The Evidence (TV series), 2006

Games
 Evidence: The Last Ritual, a PC adventure game
 Evidence: The Last Report, a PC adventure game developed for Microïds and released 1997
 CSI: Hard Evidence, a 2007 computer game based on the CSI: Crime Scene Investigation television series

Other uses
 Evidence (policy debate)
 "Evidence" (short story), 1946, by Isaac Asimov
 Evidence, an Enlightenment Foundation Libraries file manager

See also
 Proof (truth)
 Cover-up or concealment of evidence
 Evidence-based medicine
 Evidentialism, a philosophical theory of justification
 Evidentiality, a grammatical device in some languages
 Mathematical proof
 Self-evidence
 Dempster–Shafer theory of evidence
 Marginal likelihood, in Bayesian probability theory
 Greatest Hits: The Evidence, an album by Ice-T